Terry Porter (born September 12, 1953) is an American cross-country skier. She competed in two events at the 1976 Winter Olympics.

Cross-country skiing results

Olympic Games

References

External links
 

1953 births
Living people
American female cross-country skiers
Olympic cross-country skiers of the United States
Cross-country skiers at the 1976 Winter Olympics
Sportspeople from Cambridge, Massachusetts
20th-century American women